Syzran is the third largest city in Samara Oblast, Russia, located on the right bank of Saratov Reservoir of the Volga River. Population:

History
Founded in 1683 as a fortress, Syzran grew into an important trading center and was granted town status in 1796. One tower from the 17th-century fortress still stands. It is also the site of Syzran Bridge, once the longest bridge in Europe.

Administrative and municipal status
Within the framework of administrative divisions, Syzran serves as the administrative center of Syzransky District, even though it is not a part of it. As an administrative division, it is, together with three rural localities, incorporated separately as the city of oblast significance of Syzran—an administrative unit with the status equal to that of the districts. As a municipal division, the city of oblast significance of Syzran is incorporated as Syzran Urban Okrug.

Economy
The city's main employers are a large oil refinery owned by Rosneft, OAO Tyazhmash heavy industry machinery metallurgy mechanical turbines related to electricity production (and working with Czech Blansko firm CKD Blansko on some works, like in South America), and the Syzran power station.

Twin towns and sister cities
Syzran is twinned with:
 Pingdingshan, Henan, China (November 28, 2000)

Notable people
Konstantin Fedin, novelist and literary functionary
Alexey Tolstoy, writer
Arkady Ostrovsky, composer
Andrei Sinyavsky, writer
Mikhail Korniyenko, cosmonaut
Glukoza, singer
Viktor Nikitin, singer
Ekaterina Vetkova, handball player

References

Notes

Sources

External links

 Official website of Syzran

 Old photos of Syzran

Cities and towns in Samara Oblast
Populated places on the Volga
Syzransky Uyezd